Jake Newton may refer to:

Jake Newton (footballer) (born 1984),  Guyanese international footballer 
Jake Newton (ice hockey) (born 1988), American ice hockey player